The Angel, the Devil and I is a series of online English TV drama produced by Singaporean Government in 2018, starring Mark Lee, Judee Tan, Serina Sng, Stella Seah and Vee. Its content is primarily related to Civic Education in Singapore.

Theme

References 

Singaporean television series